Campylocentrum fasciola is a species of orchid. It occurs in a region ranging from southern Mexico (Chiapas and the Yucatán Peninsula) across Central America, the West Indies (Hispaniola, Jamaica, Puerto Rico, Trinidad-Tobago), and northern South America (Colombia, Venezuela, French Guiana, Guyana, Suriname, Peru, Ecuador, Bolivia, Brazil).

References

fasciola
Orchids of Mexico
Orchids of Central America
Orchids of Belize
Orchids of South America
Flora of the Caribbean
Plants described in 1840
Flora without expected TNC conservation status